Emrah Kiraz (born 30 October 1987) is a Turkish footballer who currently plays as a defender for Gaziantep Ankasspor.

Kiraz previously played for Giresunspor and Kocaelispor. He appeared in eight Süper Lig matches during 2008-09 season with Kocaelispor and Bursaspor. Also appeared in twelve TFF First League matches during 2007-08 season with Giresunspor.

External links
 Profile at TFF.org 
 

1987 births
Living people
Turkish footballers
Göztepe S.K. footballers
Bursaspor footballers
Kocaelispor footballers
Süper Lig players
Turkey under-21 international footballers

Association football midfielders
Association football defenders